The five British Railways Waggon und Maschinenbau railbuses were delivered in April 1958. They were based at Cambridge until 1964. They were withdrawn in 1966 and 1967. Four are preserved.

Background
The WMD railbuses were 5 of the total of 22 delivered in 1958 from five manufacturers (the rest British). They were planned to have "extensive trials". The underframe, power equipment, transmission and brake gear were similar to the Uerdingen railbus, common on the German Federal Railway. They were shipped via the Harwich-Zeebrugge train ferry. It was hoped they might be the answer to increasing losses on rural branch-lines. In the first year of the railbuses they saved £66,000 in operating costs, but the branches were still losing £4,000 a year (£85,000 at 2014 prices). However, at the time, such losses were unacceptable, and the lines they worked were closed.

Construction
The underframes were built of channel shaped cross-beams welded to flanged plate longitudinal girders. The corrugated steel floor was welded on top.

The body was formed of alloy panels rivetted on a light steel frame. Roof plates were crimped to increase rigidity. The body was suspended from four points on the frame, connected by hydraulic shock absorbers.

Unlike most BR diesel units, the accelerator was foot controlled. Also unusual at that time, were the power operated central doors and air powered disc brakes.

Operation
Initially the buses worked the Maldon, Braintree, and Saffron Walden lines. They had too few seats for the Braintree branch and were used on the Mildenhall line from July 1958. Mildenhall closed in 1962.  E79961/3/4 had their Buessing engines replaced by AEC A220X engines, also of 150 hp, in 1962–3, due to the cost of importing replacements from Germany. Their other branches closed in 1964, after which they spent most of their time in store at Cambridge. In 1965 79963 and 79964 were trialled on the Alston Line, but couldn't haul parcels vans and had heating problems in winter. 79961 and 79964 were transferred to serve Millers Dale in 1966, but that branch closed in 1967. M79961 was the last to be withdrawn in August 1967 and was scrapped at Rotherham in 1968.

Preservation

The other 4 buses have been preserved. They have been transferred a number of times between preserved railways. In 1966 79960 and 63 were sold to the Midland & Great Northern Joint Railway Society (later North Norfolk). In 1976 79963's AEC engine failed and was replaced. 79962 and 64 were bought by Keighley and Worth Valley Railway in 1967. To solve a problem with them slipping, they were turned round, so that the driving axle was at the rear on the uphill runs.

References

External links
youtube Llangollen Railway video - gives a good idea how much they bounced!
E79960 now at Ribble Steam Railway
E79962 being restored at the Museum of Rail Travel
history and photos of E79963, now at East Anglian Railway Museum
history and photo of M79964, now at Keighley and Worth Valley Railway
Railcar website with photo

British Rail diesel multiple units
Railcars of the United Kingdom